"I Like the Sound of That" is a song by American country music group Rascal Flatts. It was released in September 2015 as the fourth and final single from their album Rewind. The song was written by Jesse Frasure along with American singer Meghan Trainor and Shay Mooney of the American country music duo Dan + Shay.

Content
The song "lists a number of noises everyone is familiar with, but uses each as a symbol. In the first verse it’s the morning shower, the coffee pot and a door locking. All these mean the main character will be spending a few hours apart from his lover."

Critical reception
An uncredited review from Taste of Country was favorable, saying that "a young lover’s song that relies on an older couple to recall those early days when eight hours at work seemed like eight years away from a familiar pair of lips.…'I Like the Sound of That' recalls the days of the band’s biggest hits. Once again they make love sound easy."

Commercial performance
The song first entered the Billboard's Country Airplay chart at No. 40 on chart dated October 10, 2015, and entered the Hot Country Songs chart at No. 45 a week later. For the week ending April 30, 2016, the song reached number-one on the Country Airplay chart, becoming the trio's thirteenth number-one hit, and their first since "Banjo" in 2012.  The song has sold 362,000 copies in the US as of August 2016.

Music video
The music video was directed by  Kenny Jackson and John Stephens and premiered in December 2015.

Charts

Year end charts

Certifications

References

2014 songs
2015 singles
Rascal Flatts songs
Big Machine Records singles
Songs written by Jesse Frasure
Songs written by Meghan Trainor
Songs written by Shay Mooney